PeaceJam Ghana is an annual Youth Leadership Conference that is built around the Nobel Peace Prize Laureates who work with young people with the aim of imparting their skills, knowledge and wisdom to them for community and sustainable development.

The conference usually draws students from Junior High and Senior High schools across Ghana who are usually trained and mentored on diverse areas including but not limited to commitment to justice and peace, social responsibility, academic excellence, entrepreneurship and sustainable development.

History 
PeaceJam Ghana started in 2008 by its official chapter, the West Africa Center for Peace Foundation, Ghana (WACPF). PeaceJam Ghana has mentored and trained over 5000 students since its inception. PeaceJam Ghana has produced many scholars, some of whom have received the TPG Global Impact Youth Fellows scholarship to pursue higher degrees.

Wisdom Addo is the Founder and executive director of the West Africa Center for Peace Foundation, Ghana.

Partner schools 
1.      Osu Presby Senior High School
2.      Kaneshie Senior High Technical School- Accra
3.      Kraboa Coaltar Presby Senior High Technical School
4.      Half Assini Senior High School
5.      Annor Adjaye Senior High School -
6.      Accra High Senior High School – Accra
7.      St Mary's Senior High School (Ghana)
8.      St. Stephen's R/C -
9.      Prince of Peace -
10.   Star of The Sea R/C -
11.    Mataheko R/C -1936
12.    St. Kizito -
13.    Bennett Caulley -

References 

Pacifists
Annual events in Ghana
Youth organisations based in Ghana